was a Japanese car manufacturer. It was a member of the Toyota Group. In July 2012, Kanto Auto Works and two other Toyota subsidiaries were merged to form Toyota Motor East Japan.

History
In April 1946, Kanto Auto Works was established  in Yokosuka, Kanagawa Prefecture, Japan, as an independent company called Kanto Electric Motor Works which focused on repairing cars, assembling electric vehicles and producing bus bodies. In early 1948, it became a Toyota contractor, producing auto bodies. During its early years, the company also assembled some cars for Toyota (Toyota SB, Toyota Master, Toyota Crown). The company also diversified into other products such as yachts and prefabricated homes. In 1950, it adopted the Kanto Auto Works name. In 1960, the company became a permanent car assembler through a new Yokosuka plant. Later, the company replaced Yokosuka for car assembly with the Higashi-Fuji (established in 1968) and Iwate (established in 1993) plants.

Kanto Auto Works was a public company until 2011 when, following the 2011 Tohoku earthquake, Toyota announced it would make it a wholly owned subsidiary.  On July 1, 2012, Kanto Auto Works and two other Toyota subsidiaries (Central Motors and Toyota Motors Tohoku) were combined into a single company called Toyota Motor East Japan, Inc.

Facilities

Head Office, Kanagawa, Yokosuka
Higashi Fuji Research and Development Center, Susono, Shizuoka Prefecture 
Higashi Fuji Manufacturing Plant, 1200 Onyado Susono, Shizuoka Prefecture 
Iwate Manufacturing Plant, Kanegasaki, Iwate Prefecture
Fujiko Manufacturing Plant, Susono, Shizuoka Prefecture

References

External links

Toyota subsidiaries